Wangpailom Sport Club Football Club (Thai สโมสรฟุตบอลวังไผ่ล้อม สปอร์ต คลับ), is a Thai football club based in Bangkok, Thailand. The club is currently playing in the 2018 Thailand Amateur League Eastern Region.

Record

References

External links
 https://www.facebook.com/wangpailom.sportclub

Association football clubs established in 2016
Football clubs in Thailand
Chai Nat province
2016 establishments in Thailand